Ulf Lundkvist (born 1952) is a Swedish comic creator, illustrator, and painter. A nostalgia buff in love with the 1940s, 1950s, and 1960s, Lundkvist depicts the "old Sweden" with humor and affection, small towns and countryside, anachronistic places where time seem to stand still.

Lundkvist's most famous comic is probably the strip Assar, the absurd story about a hot dog who gains sentience and escapes his fate to seek adventure.

References 

Swedish comics artists
Swedish cartoonists
Swedish illustrators
Living people
1952 births